Earl of Desmond was a title in the peerage of Ireland created four times. When the powerful Earl of Desmond took arms against Queen Elizabeth Tudor, around 1578, along with the King of Spain and the Pope, he was confiscated from his estates, some 574 628 acres of land. Since 1640 the title has been held by the Feilding family as a secondary title of the Earl of Denbigh.

History of the Title

Barony of Desmond
The original Barony of Desmond in the province of Munster was held by descendants of  Thomas FitzMaurice, Lord OConnello. Thomas was the eldest son of Maurice FitzGerald, Lord of Lanstephan and he was a key supporter of the Lord of Pembroke known as ("Strongbow") in his 1169 invasion of Ireland. Maurice FitzGerald, Lord of Lanstephan was the founder of the FitzMaurice/FitzGerald  Dynasty in Ireland. Being descended from the eldest son of  Maurice FitzGerald, Lord of Lanstephan, the House of Desmond was a cadet branch of the famous Geraldines; the senior branch, the House of Kildare, were ancestors of the Dukes of Leinster, which was founded by Thomas's brother and 2nd eldest son of Maurice FitzGerald, Lord of Lanstephan namely Gerald FitzMaurice, 1st Lord of Offaly

Thomas's son, John FitzThomas, became the first Baron Desmond upon receiving, for his homage and service, a grant in 1259 of the lands of Decies and Desmond from Prince Edward of England. Before passing to Edward, these lands had been held by Thomas FitzAnthony, the father of John's wife Margery FitzAnthony.

Earl of Desmond: first and second creation

The title Earl of Desmond was first created for Maurice FitzGerald, 4th Baron Desmond in about 1329. Over time, according to English sources, the FitzGerald family became highly assimilated to the local Irish culture. The final Earl of Desmond of this creation was Gerald FitzGerald, the 14th (or, by some counts, the 15th or even the 16th) Earl.  The FitzGeralds and Fitzmaurices had resisted the Protestant Reformation of King Henry VIII and, after the failure of the first and second Desmond Rebellions, the 15th Earl was defeated and killed by forces loyal to Queen Elizabeth I on 11 November 1583.  His title, along with the enormous estates of his family, were forfeit to the English Crown.  His nephew, James FitzThomas FitzGerald, the Súgán Earl, attempted to regain control of both during the Nine Years War, but he was captured by the English and executed in 1603.

The second creation was in 1600 for James FitzGerald, the "Tower Earl", who was also created Baron Inchiquin. He was the successor of Gerald FitzGerald, 14th Earl of Desmond. He assumed the title of Earl of Desmond, which had been suppressed in 1582 after the Desmond Rebellions. He spent much of his life in captivity, and was temporarily, but unsuccessfully, restored to the earldom in 1600–01 by the English in an attempt to pacify Munster during the Nine Years War. He thus became the 1st Earl of Desmond, but soon returned to England, where he died in obscurity.

Earl of Desmond: third and fourth creation

The third creation was in 1619 for Richard Preston, 1st Lord Dingwall, who was also created Baron Dunmore.

The fourth creation happened while Preston was still alive, in 1622 for George Feilding, 1st Viscount Callan, second son of the Earl of Denbigh and nephew of James I's favourite and lover, George Villiers.  The eight-year-old Feilding was given the right to the title Earl of Desmond as and when Preston died without a male heir. Preston had also been a favourite and probably lover of James I; he had a daughter who, the plan was, George Feilding would marry, but this did not happen. In 1628 Preston died and George was made Earl of Desmond by Charles I (Preston's Scottish Lordship of Dingwall passed to his daughter Elizabeth, the Duchess of Ormond).
  
George Feilding's eldest son, the second Earl of Desmond, also inherited the title of third Earl of Denbigh after his uncle, the second Earl of Denbigh, died childless. The title Earl of Desmond has descended subsequently with the title Earl of Denbigh and the current holder is the twelfth Earl of Denbigh and eleventh Earl of Desmond.

Desmond Geraldine arms 

The coat of arms of the Geraldine Earls of Desmond, blazoned ermine a saltire gules, where the ermine tincture is a mark of cadency relative to the senior Kildare branch of the Geraldines (whose arms are more simply blazoned "argent, a saltire gules"). The crest shows a man in armour on horseback, facing to the right.

Ancestry of the Desmond Geraldines 
Thomas FitzMaurice, Lord O'Connelloe, was the progenitor of the Geraldine House of Desmond, and thus the patrilineal ancestor of the Barons Desmond, and of the earls of Desmond of the first creation.

Thomas FitzMaurice was the son of Maurice FitzGerald, Lord of Lanstephan, founder of the Irish Geraldines. Through Maurice's mother, Princess Nest ferch Rhys ap Tewdwr, the House of Desmond traced descent in the female line from the House of Dinefwr.

Over a century after Thomas's death, Gerald FitzGerald, 3rd Earl of Desmond, married Eleanor Butler. Through her, John FitzGerald, 4th Earl of Desmond and all subsequent Geraldine earls of Desmond could trace descent through Eleanor de Bohun to Elizabeth of Rhuddlan, daughter of King Edward I of England of the House of Plantagenet by his queen, Eleanor of Castile of the House of Burgundy.

Barons Desmond (1259) 

John FitzThomas FitzGerald, 1st Baron Desmond (died 1261) (son of Thomas FitzMaurice FitzGerald)
Thomas FitzMaurice FitzGerald, 2nd Baron Desmond (died 1298) (grandson of preceding)
Thomas FitzThomas FitzGerald, 3rd Baron Desmond (1290–1307) (son of preceding)
Maurice FitzThomas FitzGerald, 4th Baron Desmond (died 1356) (brother of preceding; created Earl of Desmond in 1329)

Earls of Desmond, first creation (1329) 
Authors have numbered the earls of the first creation from 1 to 14, 1 to 15, or 1 to 16, depending on whether Nicholas, an "idiot", is included as 3rd Earl, and whether John, the de facto 12th Earl (died 1536) and James FitzGerald, de jure 12th Earl of Desmond (died 1540), are both numbered 12 or are numbered 12 and 13. Wikipedia numbers the earls 1 to 14  omitting the "idiot" and numbering John de facto and James de jure both as 12, following Cokayne (1916) and the Oxford Dictionary of National Biography (2004). Burke (1866), Webb (1878) and the Dictionary of national Biography (1889) admit 15, and Bagwell (1885) 16 earls of the first creation.

Maurice FitzGerald, 1st Earl of Desmond (died 1356) (new creation)
Maurice FitzGerald, 2nd Earl of Desmond (1336–1358) (son of preceding)
Gerald FitzGerald, 3rd Earl of Desmond (died 1398) (half-brother of preceding)
John FitzGerald, 4th Earl of Desmond (died 1399) (son of preceding)
Thomas FitzGerald, 5th Earl of Desmond (–1420) (son of preceding)
James FitzGerald, 6th Earl of Desmond (died 1463) (the "Usurper," paternal uncle of preceding)
Thomas FitzGerald, 7th Earl of Desmond (died 1468) (son of preceding)
James FitzGerald, 8th Earl of Desmond (1459–1487) (son of preceding)
Maurice FitzGerald, 9th Earl of Desmond (died 1520) (brother of preceding)
James FitzGerald, 10th Earl of Desmond (died 1529) (son of preceding)
Thomas FitzGerald, 11th Earl of Desmond (1454–1534) (paternal uncle of preceding)
John FitzGerald, de facto 12th Earl of Desmond (died 1536) (brother of preceding, paternal granduncle of James FitzGerald, de jure 12th Earl of Desmond)
James FitzGerald, de jure 12th Earl of Desmond (died 1540) (grandson of Thomas FitzGerald, 11th Earl of Desmond, grandnephew of John FitzGerald, de facto 12th Earl of Desmond)
James FitzGerald, 13th Earl of Desmond (died 1558) (son of John FitzGerald, de facto 12th Earl of Desmond)
Gerald FitzGerald, 14th Earl of Desmond ( – 1583) (son of preceding; forfeit 1582)

Pretender to the first creation (1598) 
 James FitzThomas FitzGerald, the Súgán Earl, died in Tower of London

Earls of Desmond, second creation (1600) 
James FitzGerald, 1st Earl of Desmond (1571–1601) (known as the "Tower Earl of Desmond")

Earls of Desmond, third creation (1619) 
Richard Preston, 1st Earl of Desmond (died 1628) (extinct)

Earls of Desmond, fourth creation (1622) 
 George Feilding, 1st Earl of Desmond
For subsequent Earls of Desmond (title held with the title Earl of Denbigh), see List of Earls of Denbigh and Earls of Desmond.

Notes

References 
 – Dacre to Dysart

Earldoms in the Peerage of Ireland
Desmond
Extinct earldoms in the Peerage of Ireland
FitzGerald dynasty
Forfeited earldoms in the Peerage of Ireland
Noble titles created in 1329
Noble titles created in 1600
Noble titles created in 1619
Noble titles created in 1622